The Kostroma electoral district was a constituency created for the 1917 Russian Constituent Assembly election. The electoral district covered the Kostroma Governorate.

Out 15 candidate lists submitted, 5 were rejected by the electoral authorities.

In Kostroma town the Bolsheviks won the election, with 12,190 votes (43.6%), followed by the Kadets with 6,265 votes (22.4%), the Orthodox list 3,457 votes (12.4%), Mensheviks 3,147 votes (11.3%) and SRs 2,885 votes (10.3%). The Bolshevik vote was largely drawn from the military, in the town barrack the Bolsheviks obtained 79.6% of the vote.

Results

References

Electoral districts of the Russian Constituent Assembly election, 1917
Kostroma Governorate